Apple Inc. has designed and developed many external keyboard models for use with families of Apple computers, such as the Apple II, Mac, and iPad. The Magic Keyboard and Magic Keyboard with Numeric Keypad designed to be used via either Bluetooth and USB connectivity, and have integrated rechargeable batteries; The Smart Keyboard and Magic Keyboard accessories for iPads are designed to be directly attached to and powered by a host iPad. All current Apple keyboards utilize low-profile key designs, and common modifier keys.

Layout and features 

To serve the functionality of the Macintosh operating systems (and because of historical differences), the Apple Keyboard's layout differs somewhat from that of the ubiquitous IBM PC keyboard, mainly in its modifier and special keys. Some of these keys have unique symbols defined in the Unicode block Miscellaneous Technical. Features different from other keyboards include:

 The Command key (⌘), used in most Mac keyboard shortcuts. The key functions as a Meta key or Super key in Unix-like environments, and is equally equivalent to the Windows key in Windows environments, although in common applications it performs the same function as the Windows Control key. Compared to their equivalents on the standard IBM PC keyboard layout the Command key and the Option key are located in reverse order.
 The "open" (hollow) and separate "closed" (solid) Apple logo keys on the Apple II series, served functions similar to that of the Command key. The open-Apple key was combined with the Command key on Apple Desktop Bus keyboards (which were used on both the Apple IIgs and several years of Macintosh models) where it remained after the Apple II line was discontinued.
 The Option key (⌥), for entering diacritics and other special characters. Like the Shift and Control keys, the Option key serves as a modifier for the Command key shortcuts, as well as being used to type many special characters. It serves the function of the solid-Apple key in Apple II applications. It functions as the Alt key in Unix and Windows environments. Compared to their equivalents on the standard IBM PC keyboard layout the Command key and the Option key are located in reverse order.
 Full-sized desktop keyboards with a dedicated numpad have function keys that can range up to F15, F16, or F19. F17-F19 keys were introduced with the aluminium USB keyboard. Compact keyboards such as the bluetooth wireless aluminium keyboard and the built-in keyboards on all Intel-based Macintosh notebooks range from F1-F12 only, just like IBM PC keyboards.
 A Clear key, instead of a Num Lock key, on models with full numeric keypads, as these are dedicated to numeric input and not generally used for cursor control.
 An "equals" key (=) added to the numeric keypad.
 A Help key, instead of an Insert key, or on the most recent aluminum keyboards, a fn key, which toggles the function of the function keys between their default functions and special functions (volume control, Exposé, etc.).
 Notebook computers typically include additional assignments shared with function keys: reduce and increase brightness, volume up, volume down, mute, and eject (⏏). Apple, since the release of the Pro Keyboard, provides these last four keys on desktop keyboards above the numeric keypad where status indicator lights are on many IBM PC keyboards. On the newest aluminum keyboard, these functions are accessed with the function keys, just like on the Apple laptops.
 On Apple Desktop Bus keyboards, a power key (◁), used to turn on computers that supported it (and to type the Mac three-finger salute). On keyboards with function keys, it was placed either on the left or right edge of the same keyboard row as the function keys; on keyboards without function keys it was placed in a central location above the other keys. The power key was replaced with a more conventional power button on early USB keyboards, thanks to a proprietary pin wired to the Macintosh's power supply in Apple's early USB implementations, subsequently eliminated on the Pro Keyboard along with the special power supply pin. Most of its functions were transferred to the eject (⏏) key in such later keyboards (holding down the control key simultaneously to make the eject key act like the power key).
 On the Apple IIGS, this key, used in conjunction with the control key, is reset. Used in conjunction with the open Apple key, reset reboots the computer.  Various other reset key combinations do various other things.
 The Apple UK keyboard layout has the @ and " keys in their US locations (on the 2 and ' keys respectively). These are normally reversed on non-Apple UK keyboards.

Image of US keyboard layout

Usage of function keys

Current keyboards

Magic Keyboard (2nd generation) 

The Magic Keyboard is Apple's current design of external keyboards designed for use with Mac computers. It can use either wireless Bluetooth connectivity, or a wired connection via a USB to Lightning cable. It utilizes scissor-switch key mechanisms, and comes in several layouts and colors, including the option of a Numeric Keypad, Touch ID fingerprint authentication, and colors to match each color variant of the M1 iMac.
 A2449 Magic Keyboard with Touch ID: 77 keys
 May 2021: Bundled / optional upgrade with M1 iMac in any of seven colors: silver, pink, blue, green, purple, orange, or yellow
 August 2021: Standalone ($149) (MK293LL/A EMC 3579): Silver
 A2450 Magic Keyboard: 78 keys
 May 2021 (MK2A3LL/A $99 EMC 3619); Silver
 A2520 Magic Keyboard with Touch ID and Numeric Keypad: 109 keys
 May 2021: Bundled with M1 iMac in any of seven colors: silver, pink, blue, green, purple, orange, or yellow
 August 2021: Standalone (MK2C3LL/A: Silver with white keys $179 EMC 3957)
 August 2021: Standalone (MMMR3LL/A: Silver with black keys $199; EMC 3957)

Smart Keyboard for iPad 

Released in November 2015 alongside the iPad Pro (1st generation), the Smart Keyboard is Apple's first keyboard cover accessory for iPad. It is powered by the iPad's Smart Connector, and does not require separate charging or batteries. It keys use a butterfly-switch mechanism, with its keys covered by a fabric material. When unfolded, the Smart Keyboard only allows for one viewing angle position; when folded, the Smart Keyboard only protects the front of the iPad. The Smart Keyboard is compatible with iPad Pro models from 2015 to 2017, the iPad Air (3rd generation), and iPad models from 2019 to 2021. At release, it received criticism for its high price tag.

An updated design, named Smart Keyboard Folio, was released alongside the iPad Pro (3rd generation), with support for two viewing angles and back protection. The Smart Keyboard Folio is compatible with 11-inch and 12.9-inch iPad Pro models from 2018 and later, and iPad Air models from 2020 and later.

Magic Keyboard for iPad 

On March 18, 2020, the Magic Keyboard was announced alongside the introduction mouse cursor support for iPadOS 13, and includes a trackpad and front-and-back protection, as a more capable alternative to the Smart Keyboard. Like the Smart Keyboard, it uses the Smart Connector to draw power, and also comes with a USB-C port for pass-through charging of the iPad Pro. Its keys are backlit and use a scissor-switch mechanism. It attaches magnetically to the iPad Pro or iPad Air, which sits above a cantilever that allows adjusting the viewing angle.

Several revisions of the Magic Keyboard have been released, in black and white colors, and are compatible with 11-inch and 12.9-inch iPad Pro models from 2018 and later, and 10.9-inch iPad Air models from 2020 and later. A non-floating version, named Magic Keyboard Folio, was released for the iPad (10th generation).

Discontinued keyboards

Apple Numeric Keypad IIe (A2M2003) 

The Numeric Keypad IIe was Apple's first external keypad. Released as an option specifically for the popular Apple IIe computer in 1983, it helped correct some of the II series' shortcomings. Later, the Platinum IIe would incorporate the numeric keypad into its built-in keyboard.

Lisa Keyboard (A6MB101) 
The first keyboard not to be integrated into the CPU case like the Apple II and III series before it. It was designed for and came with the Apple Lisa. Like the Apple III before it, it was intended to be a business computer and included an integrated numeric keypad. Like all Apple computers before it, it came in a beige case to match the CPU and connected by a unique TRS connector. In addition it carried over the use of the "open" Apple key from the Apple III as a command key (though it was represented by the "closed" Apple character) and included a pullout reference guide hidden under the keyboard.

Macintosh Keyboard (M0110) 

Introduced and included with the original Macintosh in 1984, it debuted with neither arrow keys to control the cursor nor an integrated numeric keypad. It used a telephone cord-style RJ-11 connector to the case (also used with the Amstrad PCW series of computers). The keyboard pinouts are "crossed" so it isn't possible to use a standard telephone cord as a replacement; doing so will result in damage to the keyboard or the computer. The keyboard also introduced a unique command key similar to the "open" Apple Key on the Lisa.

Macintosh Numeric Keypad (M0120) 
Like the Apple IIe before it, the Macintosh provided an optional external keypad which also included arrow keys that daisy chained to the CPU via the telephone-cord connectors. Though introduced with the Macintosh in January 1984, Apple did not ship it until September 1984 at a retail price of US$99.

Macintosh Numeric Keypad (M0120P) 
This version of the numeric keypad, compared to M0120, uses symbols on the Clear and Enter keys, instead of text.

Macintosh Plus Keyboard (M0110A) 

Introduced and included with the Macintosh Plus in 1986, it was an extended keyboard that had a built-in numeric keypad. In 1987 it was updated to Apple's new Platinum gray color. It continued to use the telephone-cord style connector to the system and was interchangeable with the M0110. Though Apple switched all other keyboards to Apple Desktop Bus connectors by this time, this keyboard was manufactured unchanged for four more years until the Plus was discontinued in 1990.

Apple Desktop Bus Keyboard (A9M0330) 

This was the first Apple keyboard to use the new Apple Desktop Bus (ADB) connector first seen on the Apple IIGS. Designed to be compatible with both the Macintosh and Apple product lines, it was the first to combine both the Macintosh command key and Apple II "open" Apple key legends. Entirely Platinum gray in color (later Macintosh Plus keyboards had a platinum gray case with darker gray keys called "Smoke"), it was also the first to use Snow White design language that was similar to the Apple IIc. However, it duplicated the extended design established by the Plus. It was also the first to include an external power/reset button and an extra ADB port.

Apple (Standard) Keyboard (M0116) 

Also known as the Apple Standard Keyboard, it was the first to officially use this name. Apple would later reuse the name for a series of successive keyboards. The Apple Keyboard was a more solid version of the Apple Desktop Bus Keyboard and optionally included with the Macintosh II and SE in 1987. The heftier design solidified visually the power performance embodied by the upgraded Macs. Aside from weight the main difference was the significantly thicker frame width. It was the first keyboard to be sold separately from the system, giving the customer a choice of the basic or advanced keyboards offered by Apple.

Apple Extended Keyboard (M0115) 

Apple's advanced keyboard, the first to be sold optionally, was essentially a redesigned version of the Apple Keyboard, with an enhanced extended keyboard with FKeys and other PC-style keys. It included template guides above the top row of function keys to accommodate shortcut key references which accommodate many software packages. It was the heaviest of all the Macintosh keyboards and set the standard for many typists. It was sold separately from any Apple computer and retailed for US$163.

Apple Keyboard II (M0487) 

Introduced and sold with the Macintosh Classic and LC in 1990, this keyboard was almost identical to the original ADB Keyboard, but included flip-down feet to change the typing angle and a design change that gave the frame and keys a more streamlined appearance. Internally, the M0487 differed from the original M0116, as the M0487 did not use mechanical keyswitches (save for the Caps Lock). In 1993, the Macintosh TV, the first Mac introduced in all black, came with an identical black Keyboard II (using the same model number). This keyboard marked the return of Apple including a standard keyboard together with the computer itself.

Apple Extended Keyboard II 

A minor update to the Apple Extended Keyboard to coincide with the release of the Macintosh IIsi in 1990, it added an adjustable height feature.

 (M0312) was manufactured with the classic Alps mechanisms
 (M3501) was manufactured with Mitsumi or Alps mechanisms.

Apple Adjustable Keyboard (M1242) 

The Apple Adjustable Keyboard, which was sold as an optional upgrade, was Apple's 1993 entry into the ergonomically adjustable keyboard market. It was often criticized for its flimsy construction. It came with a separate keypad (not sold separately), the first to do so since the original Macintosh keyboard.

Newton Keyboard (X0044) 

In the mid-1990s Apple released the Apple Newton sub-mini keyboard to allow a quick input alternative to the Newton's handwriting recognition, which required extensive training to become useful. It connected via the Newton's serial interface. Many Mac users favoring the portable size were able to use it on a Mac utilizing a third-party enabler. Like the iPhone that would come 10 years later, the Newton also included a virtual keyboard.

AppleDesign Keyboard (M2980) 

This was the first major redesign of the Apple keyboard, featuring more fluid, curving lines to match the look of the new Apple product style. It was an unpopular replacement for the Apple Extended Keyboard II in 1994. Significantly lighter than its predecessors, it had a much softer and quieter key interface that was unpopular with many typists. It also included only one ADB port for mice or other pointing devices, concealed on the underside, with the keyboard's cable permanently attached. The Extended II had an ADB port on either side of the keyboard, allowing the keyboard cable or mouse to be attached to the side preferred by the user. This keyboard was also produced in black using the same model number (like the Apple Keyboard II for the Macintosh TV), for inclusion with the black Performa 5420 released primarily in Europe, and the black Power Macintosh 5500 released in Asia.

Twentieth Anniversary Macintosh Keyboard (M3459) 
Bundled with the Twentieth Anniversary Macintosh in 1997, this keyboard once again excluded an integrated keypad, though unlike the Adjustable Keyboard none was offered. Based on a PowerBook form factor it also included an optional built-in trackpad and leather palm rests. This was the last ADB keyboard Apple would produce, and was not sold separately.

Apple USB Keyboard (M2452) 

Released and sold with the iMac in 1998 this became the new standard for all Macintosh models for the next two years. It was the first to use translucent plastics, first in Bondi blue, then in a darker gray called "Graphite" for the PowerMac G4 line and fruit-colored for each of the five first color variations of the iMac. It had a built-in retractable support leg. It also marked a return to the standard keyboard with integrated keypad with the enhanced cursor keys above the keypad. The keyboard had a power key on the top right side (implemented by shorting the D-line to ground), and was the last keyboard to have one. This keyboard can be used with Windows (although the power key has no function).

Apple Pro Keyboard (M7803) 

 (M7803, 109 black keys) Originally introduced as the Apple Pro Keyboard in 2000, but discontinued three years later, this keyboard reintroduced the additional extended function keys last seen in the Apple Design Keyboard and debuted in a clear case with black keys. One major departure from all previous ADB and USB keyboards was the removal of the remote power key. This keyboard contained 109 keys (ANSI), and retained the single folding leg on the bottom. This was also the keyboard that came with the iconic Power Mac G4 Cube.
 (M7803, 109 white keys, iMac G4) A version with white keys was introduced in 2002 alongside the iMac G4.

Apple Keyboard (109 and 78 keys) 

 (A1048, white, 109 keys, USB 1.1 and USB 2.0) In May 2003, the keyboard underwent a major redesign which eliminated the frame enclosing the keys while adding an F16 key and moving the USB ports to the back.  This revision also renamed the device as just the 'Apple Keyboard', thus dropping 'Pro' from the commercial name, but the complete name 'Apple Pro Keyboard' is always used in internal technical information, as seen in the System Information app for example. The A1048 was updated in 2005 with USB 2.0 ports replacing the USB 1.1 ports. The A1048 was available only in white until it was again redesigned in 2007.
 (A1243, aluminium, 109 keys, MB110LL/A and MB110LL/B) The Apple Keyboard introduced in 2007, has a solid aluminum enclosure, as does the similarly styled Apple Wireless Keyboard. This same keyboard is also the first of Apple's keyboards in 27 years to omit the long-enduring Apple logo(s) denoting the Command key's backward compatibility with the Apple key that was originally introduced on keyboards compatible with the Apple II series of computers. This convention, however, lasted much longer than Apple had intended because of how it was retained by all keyboards which used the Apple Desktop Bus connection standard that the company introduced with the release of the Apple IIGS.  By the time that Apple discontinued the external use of ADB, the legacy practice of including the Apple symbol on the Command key had stuck. This model of the Apple keyboard also has two down-stream USB 2.0 ports, one at each end of the keyboard (like M2452 and M7803). This model was renamed as the 'Apple Keyboard with Numeric Keypad' after the release of the A1242 model in March 2009. This model was discontinued on 5 June 2017 and was the last wired keyboard produced by Apple. It is worth noting that there are two versions of the A1243 keyboard (the MB110LL/A and MB110LL/B), that are distinguished by the icons on the F3 and F4 keys. This slight update took place in July 2011 on the release of OS X Lion and changed the label on the Exposé key (F3) to Mission Control and changing the Dashboard key (F4) to a Launchpad key.
 (A1242, aluminium, 78 keys, iMac) Early 2009 iMac revisions shipped with a new version of the wired keyboard, which omitted the numeric pad, similar to its wireless counterpart. The full keyboard with numeric pad remained available as a build-to-order option for an extra charge, and could also be purchased separately. The A1242 was discontinued in December 2010.

Apple Wireless Keyboard 

 (A1016, white, 109 keys, Bluetooth 1.1) Introduced in 2003, this model was based on the Bluetooth standard. It was essentially identical to the revised Apple Keyboard offered four months earlier. According to the Apple website, it is not compatible with iPads, unlike later models.
 (A1255, aluminium, 78 keys, Bluetooth) In 2007, an updated model clad in aluminum was released, which, like the MacBook's keyboard, eliminated the integrated numeric keypad and special keys. It takes three AA batteries, with the power button on the right-hand side of the keyboard opposite the battery opening.
 (A1314, aluminium, 78 keys, Bluetooth 2.0, MC184LL/A and MC184LL/B) On October 20, 2009, the aluminum model was updated (MC184LL/A) so that only two AA batteries are needed instead of three; two changes occurred in the physical appearance: firstly, the placement of the plastic window for the Bluetooth transceiver, which moved from the right-hand side of the keyboard's bottom to the centre, and secondly, the keyboard was a few millimeters wider in depth than the previous wireless keyboard. Like the Magic Mouse released on the same date, it requires Mac OS X 10.6 or later. In July 2011, a minor update (MC184LL/B) was made to the previous model, for Mac OS X Lion. The Exposé and Dashboard legends have been replaced with those for Mission Control and Launchpad, respectively.

Magic Keyboard (1st generation) 

 A1644 Magic Keyboard: 78 keys
 October 13, 2015 – May 2021: MLA22LL/A (EMC 2815) $99; SilverReleased for OS X El Capitan and later. It has a built-in rechargeable Lithium-ion battery with a Lightning connector for charging and an on/off switch.
 A1843 Magic Keyboard with Numeric Keypad: 109 keys
 June 5, 2017 – current: MQ052LL/A (EMC 3138) $129; Silver
 March 27, 2018 – May 2021: MRMH2LL/A (EMC 3138) $129; Space Gray

See also 
 Apple pointing devices
 Apple Newton user interface
 IBM PC keyboard
 iPhone text input
 Timeline of Apple Inc. products

References

External links 
 

Apple II peripherals

Computer keyboard models
Macintosh peripherals